Ngô Tùng Quốc (born 27 January 1998) is a Vietnamese  footballer who plays as a defender for V.League 1 side Hồ Chí Minh City.

Career statistics

Club

Notes

Honours
Hồ Chí Minh City
V.League 1: Runner-up: 2020
Vietnamese Super Cup: Runner-up: 2020

References

External links

1998 births
Living people
Vietnamese footballers
V.League 1 players
Association football defenders
Ho Chi Minh City FC players